Rhapsody of the Seas is a  operated by Royal Caribbean International.

Areas of operation
After six years of sailing from Galveston, Texas, Rhapsody of the Seas repositioned on a world trip in the autumn of 2007, traveling through the South Pacific to Australia where she remained for two months, before moving to Asia, operating cruises from Singapore, Hong Kong, Shanghai and Busan, South Korea. For the summer of 2008, Rhapsody of the Seas operated out of Seattle, Washington, sailing to Alaska before repositioning back to Sydney, Australia for the winter of 2008/2009.

Rhapsody of the Seas sailed her final season in Australia during the winter 2014/2015 season, repositioning to Europe sailing from Rome in April 2015. During the 2015/2016 winter she sailed from São Paulo, Brazil.

After her 2016 summer season, Rhapsody of the Seas sailed to Tampa, Florida conducting cruises to the Western Caribbean. She will reposition to Cape Liberty, New Jersey for the 2017 summer season, sailing to the Bahamas and Canada/New England, before repositioning back to Tampa.

Refit
In March 2012, the ship received a US$54 million dry dock refit which added additional cabins, an outdoor movie screen near the pool, new dining areas and a nursery.

The ship subsequently received an additional refit in late 2016.

In late 2019, Rhapsody was in drydock in Cádiz, Spain for some routine maintenance, cosmetic improvements, and technology upgrades, but did not see any major reconfigurations.

Incidents
On 24 March 1998, 23-year-old passenger Amy Lynn Bradley disappeared without a trace aboard the ship when the ship was about to dock at  Curaçao, Antilles. Police investigations ruled out the possibility that she fell overboard and drowned or that she disappeared voluntarily, but failed to locate her.
On New Year's Day, 2010, a 15-year-old passenger was raped by a crew member. She had been seasick during the cruise and was resting alone in a cabin when a man wearing a bartenders uniform entered.
On 25 April 2016, Rhapsody of the Seas was hit by a rogue wave en route to Santorini, Greece. It struck at 4 am, breaking the windows of six-passenger cabins and partially flooded other staterooms on decks 2 and 3. No serious injuries were reported by Royal Caribbean, and the ship continued on its 10-day cruise from Venice, Italy.
On 19 September 2016, the ship severely listed after strong winds blew against the ship. A dozen large windows in the Viking Crown Lounge were reportedly broken as well as other onboard fixtures; however, there were no reported injuries by the cruise line and Rhapsody of the Seas continued to Santorini, Greece as scheduled.
On 22 September 2019, a crew member died after going overboard while the ship was docked in the Croatian port of Dubrovnik. Royal Caribbean said the 35-year-old waiter had committed suicide but his family in India denied this.
 In April 2020, as the cruise industry was given a no sail order due to the spread of COVID-19, the Centers for Disease Control and Prevention reported that at least one person had tested positive for the virus within 14 days after disembarking from the ship the previous month.

References

External links

 Ship Fact Sheet - Royal Caribbean 
 Miramar Ship Index - Rhapsody of the Seas

Cruise ships of Norway
Ships of Royal Caribbean International
Ships built in France
1996 ships